The Alaska–Alaska Anchorage men's ice hockey rivalry is a college ice hockey rivalry between the Alaska Nanooks men's ice hockey and Alaska Anchorage Seawolves men's ice hockey programs. The first meeting between the two occurred on November 16, 1979.

History
Alaska, originally Alaska Agricultural College, began playing ice hockey in 1925. However, due to being so far away from any other college team, the program had difficulty finding opponents. This was a contributing factor in the school suspending its ice hockey program several times over the next 50 years. Alaska Anchorage, with assistance of head coach Brush Christiansen, promoted its ice hockey program to varsity status in 1979. A year later Alaska, then Alaska–Fairbanks, followed suit. The two programs were able to stabilize one another by providing a consistent opponent and allowing each team to steadily improve. Due to their proximity and the sheer number of times they played one another in the 1980 it would have almost been impossible for the two programs to not have become rivals.

In 1984, both programs were promoted to Division I status when the entire Division II level collapsed. A year later they joined with two teams from the lower-48 to form the Great West Hockey Conference. The experiment lasted just three years but it did give the two Alaska schools a greater profile in college hockey and eventually led to both joining other more established conferences. When Alaska Anchorage joined the WCHA in 1993, it caused the number of meeting between the two schools to drop but they continued to play one another each season. In order to continue the relevance of the rivalry, the 93–94 season was the inaugural year that the Governor's Cup was awarded.

In the interim, Alaska joined the CCHA and remained with the league for 19 years until it was dissolved in 2013. Alaska then joined the WCHA and the two programs became conference rivals once more. In 2010s, with Alaska facing an economic downturn, there were rumors that the two programs would be merged to reduce the cost of operating both programs. While this plan never came to fruition, the COVID-19 pandemic caused a financial crisis for both clubs. Alaska was able to survive the troubles but in 2020, Alaska Anchorage announced that the 2020–21 season would be their last. In the end, the pandemic forced the Seawolves to cancel the campaign and suspend operations in November.

Fundraising efforts did eventually succeed in allowing Alaska Anchorage to announce its return for the 22–23 season. While both teams will likely be playing one another soon, neither is a member of a conference and their long-term viability has yet to be settled.

Game results
Full game results for the rivalry, with rankings beginning in the 1998–99 season.

Series facts

References

External links
 Alaska Nanooks men's ice hockey
 Alaska Anchorage Seawolves men's ice hockey

College ice hockey rivalries in the United States
Alaska Nanooks ice hockey
Alaska Anchorage Seawolves men's ice hockey
1980 establishments in Alaska